Joseph or Joe Drake may refer to:

 Joseph Rodman Drake (1795–1820), American poet
 Joseph Drake (soldier) (1806–1878), Confederate Army colonel
 Joseph Morley Drake (1828–1886), doctor and educator
 Joe Drake (American football) (1963–1994), American football player
 Joe Drake (producer), film producer